Mikael Almén (born 8 March 2000) is a Finnish footballer who plays as a defender for Finnish Veikkausliiga side Ilves.

References

2000 births
Living people
Finnish footballers
Finland youth international footballers
Finland under-21 international footballers
Association football defenders
FC Ilves players
HJS Akatemia players
Veikkausliiga players
Kakkonen players
People from Naantali
Sportspeople from Southwest Finland